Ali Wazed Zafar (known as Zafar Wazed) is a Bangladeshi journalist. He is the incumbent Director General of the Press Institute of Bangladesh (PIB). In recognition of his contribution to journalism, the government of Bangladesh awarded him the country's second highest civilian award Ekushey Padak in 2020.

Zafar was born at Daudkandi in Cumilla. He graduated from the University of Dhaka and became involved in journalism. He served as the literary affairs secretary of the Dhaka University Central Students' Union (DUCSU). On 27 April 2019, the government of Bangladesh appointed him as the director general of the Press Institute of Bangladesh.

References 

 Living people
 People from Comilla District
 University of Dhaka alumni
Bangladeshi journalists
 Recipients of the Ekushey Padak
 Year of birth missing (living people)